Soetomo (born Soebroto; 30 July 1888 – 30 May 1938) was an Indonesian physician and nationalist. He was the co-founder of Budi Utomo, the first native political society in the Dutch East Indies, and led the Great Indonesia Party (Parindra) from 1935 until his death. Soetomo was declared a national hero by President Sukarno in 1961.

Biography
He was born in East Java, and went on to study medicine. While still studying, he was one of three founders of the Budi Utomo Javanese nationalist organisation. From 1919 to 1923, studied medicine at Amsterdam University and later married a Dutch woman. After returning from the Netherlands, he worked as a doctor in Sumatra and Surabaya. He also established a number of "study clubs" to raise awareness of nationalism. In 1935, he was one of the founders of Parindra, and led it until his death. After his death he was named a National Hero of Indonesia.

References

National Heroes of Indonesia
1888 births
1938 deaths
Physicians from the Dutch East Indies